Hungary competed at the 2012 Summer Paralympics in London, United Kingdom from August 29 to September 9, 2012.

Medalists

The following Hungarian competitors won medals at the Games.

Athletics

Men
Track & road events

Field events

Women
Track & road events

Judo

Men

Women

Powerlifting

Men

Rowing

Women

Shooting

Men

Women

Table tennis

Men

Wheelchair fencing

Men

Women

Wheelchair tennis

Men

References

Nations at the 2012 Summer Paralympics
2012
2012 in Hungarian sport